Some Girls Wander by Mistake is a compilation album by English band the Sisters of Mercy, released on 27 April 1992 on their own label Merciful Release, distributed by East West/Warner Music UK.

The album collected the complete and unedited studio recording work of the band from 1980 to 1983: their first six singles and EPs, "The Damage Done", "Body Electric", "Anaconda", Alice, The Reptile House, and the 12-inch edition of "Temple of Love". The 2017 release includes two alternate mixes of "Under the Gun": Metropolis mix and Jutland mix, originally released in 1993 on the 12-inch vinyl of "Under the Gun".

Background 
"Temple of Love" is the only song from the 1980–1983 time period that was published with an "extended version". The album does not contain the 7-inch version of the song, which is the same as the extended version but faded out halfway. Although "Temple of Love" was re-recorded in 1992 to promote the compilation album's release, the new version was not initially included on the album. "Temple of Love (1992)" featured Israeli vocalist Ofra Haza.

The compilation includes cover versions of "1969", originally recorded by the Stooges, and "Gimme Shelter", originally recorded by the Rolling Stones, which appeared on the Alice and Temple of Love 12 inch EPs, respectively.

The album title derived from the Leonard Cohen song "Teachers", from the 1967 album Songs of Leonard Cohen, which was a staple live cover for the band throughout its career. The full line is: "Some girls wander by mistake / Into the mess that scalpels make". Songs of Leonard Cohen also included the Cohen song "Sisters of Mercy", which provided the band's name.

Release 
The album was issued as a limited-edition CD with artwork "postcards" of the early vinyl singles, and as a regular CD without such cards.

Track listing

The B-side to "Anaconda" was "Phantom", previously made available on the "Alice" EP. Digital versions of the album feature the extended version of "Temple of Love (1992)", in addition to or replacing the original extended version.

2017 bonus tracks

Personnel
Tracks 1–13, 17–19
Andrew Eldritch – vocals
Craig Adams – bass guitar
Ben Gunn – guitar
Gary Marx – guitar
Doktor Avalanche (drum machine) – drums

Track 14–16
Andrew Eldritch – vocals (lead on 14), guitar, drums
Gary Marx – vocals (lead on 15 and 16), guitar

Charts

Weekly charts

Year-end charts

Certifications

References

External links
 Sleeve notes of the album
 Story of the first single

1992 compilation albums
East West Records compilation albums
Merciful Release compilation albums
The Sisters of Mercy compilation albums
Warner Music Group compilation albums